V 302 Bremen was a German fishing trawler that was requisitoned by the Kriegsmarine during the Second World War for use as a vorpostenboot. She was built in 1929 as Karl Kühling and was renamed Bremen in 1937. She was returned to her owners post-war and was scrapped in 1953.

Description
The engine was built by the Ottensener Maschinenbau GmbH, Altona, Germany. It was rated at 88nhp.

History
Karl Kühling was built as yard number 279 by the Schiffswerft von Henry Koch, AG, Lübeck, Germany for the Hochseefischerei Julius Weeting AG, Bremerhaven, Germany. She was launched in April 1929 and completed on 21 May. The fishing boat registration BX 202 was allocated, as were the Code Letters OVMT. On 16 June 1930, her registration was changed to ON 136, then to PG 475 on 4 September 1934. On 10 November, she was placed under the management the Nordsee Deutsche Hochsee Fisherei Bremen-Cuxhaven AG. During 1934, her code letters were changed to DNON. Karl Kühling was lengthened in 1936.

In January 1937, her name was changed to Bremen. She was requisitioned by the Kriegsmarine on 20 September 1939 for use as a vorpostenboot. She was allocated to 3 Vorpostenflotille as V 302 Bremen. She was returned to her owners on 18 August 1945. In November 1952, she sprang a leak and sank in the North Sea. Although raised, she was scrapped in Hamburg, West Germany in January 1953.

References

Sources

1929 ships
Ships built in Lübeck
Fishing vessels of Germany
Steamships of Germany
World War II merchant ships of Germany
Auxiliary ships of the Kriegsmarine
Fishing vessels of West Germany
Maritime incidents in 1952